Countess of Richmond is a title that was given to the wife of the Earl of Richmond (title now defunct). Women who have held the title include:

In her own right
Constance, Duchess of Brittany (1161–1201)
Eleanor, Fair Maid of Brittany (c.1184–1241)
Alix, Duchess of Brittany (1200–1221)

By marriage
Bertha, Duchess of Brittany (fl. 1125-55), wife of Alan, 1st Earl of Richmond
Margaret of Huntingdon, Duchess of Brittany (1145–1201), wife of Conan IV, Duke of Brittany, Earl of Richmond
Blanche of Navarre, Duchess of Brittany (1226–1283), wife of John I, Duke of Brittany
Beatrice of England (1242–1275), wife of John II, Duke of Brittany
Isabella of Castile, Queen of Aragon (1283–1328), second wife of John III 
Joan of Savoy (1310-1344), third wife of John III, Duke of Brittany 
Joan of Valois, Countess of Beaumont (1304–1363), wife of Robert III of Artois
Blanche of Lancaster (1342–1368), first wife of John of Gaunt
Constance of Castile, Duchess of Lancaster (1354–1394), second wife of John of Gaunt
Joan Holland, Duchess of Brittany (1350–1384), second wife of John IV, Duke of Brittany 
Margaret of Nevers (1393–1442), first wife of Arthur III, Duke of Brittany
Anne of Burgundy (1404-1432), first wife of John of Lancaster, Duke of Bedford.
Jacquetta of Luxembourg (1415/6-1472), second wife of John, Duke of Bedford.
Catherine of Luxembourg-Saint-Pol (1445–1458), third wife of Arthur III
Margaret Beaufort, Countess of Richmond and Derby (1441/3–1509), wife of Edmund Tudor, 1st Earl of Richmond